Flensburg – Schleswig is an electoral constituency (German: Wahlkreis) represented in the Bundestag. It elects one member via first-past-the-post voting. Under the current constituency numbering system, it is designated as constituency 1. It is located in northeastern Schleswig-Holstein, comprising the city of Flensburg and the Schleswig-Flensburg district.

Flensburg – Schleswig was created for the 1976 federal election. Since 2021, it has been represented by Robert Habeck of the Alliance 90/The Greens.

Geography
Flensburg – Schleswig is located in northeastern Schleswig-Holstein. As of the 2021 federal election, it comprises the urban district of Flensburg and the district of Schleswig-Flensburg.

History
Flensburg – Schleswig was created in 1976 and contained parts of the abolished constituencies of Flensburg and Schleswig – Eckernförde. Its borders and constituency number have not changed since its creation.

Members
The constituency was held by the Social Democratic Party (SPD) from its creation in 1976 until 1983, during which time it was represented by Egon Bahr. It was won by the Christian Democratic Union (CDU) in 1983, and represented by Harm Dallmeyer (until 1987) and Wolfgang Börnsen. In 1998, it was won by the SPD's Wolfgang Wodarg. Former member Börnsen won the constituency again in 2009, and represented it until 2013. He was succeeded by Sabine Sütterlin-Waack, who served until 2017, and then by Petra Nicolaisen. Robert Habeck of the Greens won the constituency in the 2021 election.

Election results

2021 election

2017 election

2013 election

2009 election

2005 election

References

Federal electoral districts in Schleswig-Holstein
1976 establishments in West Germany
Constituencies established in 1976